Wilmington Township is a township in New Hanover County, North Carolina. The population at the 2010 census was 106,476.

References

Townships in North Carolina